is a passenger railway station  located in the city of Kawanishi, Hyōgo Prefecture, Japan. It is operated by the private transportation company Nose Electric Railway.

Lines

Station layout
The station consists of one side platform and one island platform, connected by an elevated station building. The station is staffed.

Platforms

Adjacent stations

History
Hirano Station opened on April 13, 1913. The current station building was competed in March 1981.

Passenger statistics
In fiscal 2019, the station was used by an average of 6,743 passengers daily

Surrounding area
Nose Electric Railway Headquarters
Kyoritsu Onsen Hospital

See also
List of railway stations in Japan

References

External links 

 Hirano Station official home page 

Railway stations in Hyōgo Prefecture
Stations of Nose Electric Railway
Railway stations in Japan opened in 1913
Kawanishi, Hyōgo